Alan III of Rennes (c. 997 – 1 October 1040) (French: Alain III de Bretagne) was Count of Rennes and duke of Brittany, by right of succession from 1008 to his death.

Life
Alan was the son of Duke Geoffrey I and Hawise of Normandy. 

Alan succeeded his father as Duke of Brittany in 1008. Because he was still a minor at his father's death, his mother acted as regent of Brittany   while her brother Richard II, Duke of Normandy assumed guardianship over Brittany.

Marriage
In 1018 Alan married Bertha of Blois, daughter of Odo II, Count of Blois and his second wife Ermengarde of Auvergne.

Norman suzerainty
When Richard III, Duke of Normandy died in August 1026, his brother Robert I succeeded him. Alan apparently took advantage of the resulting turmoil to break free of Norman suzerainty. 

In the early 1030s Robert I successfully attacked Dol and Alan's retaliatory raid on Avranches was repulsed causing continued raiding back and forth between them. Facing an invasion from Normandy via land and from Duke Robert's fleet, Robert, Archbishop of Rouen (uncle of Hawise and Richard II) mediated a truce between his two great-nephews at Mont Saint-Michel where Alan swore fealty to his cousin Robert.

Guardian
When he left Normandy for the Holy Land Robert I, Duke of Normandy appointed his cousin, Alan III, to be a guardian of his young son William.

Wars
Alan III also assisted Herbert I 'Wake-Dog' in his wars with 
Avesgaud, Bishop of Le Mans and was with the count in his attack on Avesgaud's castle at La Ferté-Bernard destroying the castle and causing Avesgaud to flee.

Protector
In 1037, upon the death of Robert, Archbishop of Rouen, the protection of young William was now left to Alan III and his cousin Gilbert, who tentatively held Normandy together. They appointed Mauger to the now vacant see of Rouen and his brother William as count of Arques, attempting to gain their support for Duke William.

Death
On 1 October 1040, while besieging a rebel castle near Vimoutiers in Normandy, Alan III suddenly died. According to Orderic, he was poisoned by unnamed Normans.

Family
Alain and Bertha of Blois had:

 Conan II, (d. 1066), succeeded his father. 
 Hawise of Brittany, who married Hoel of Cornouaille.

After 14 May 1046 his widow Bertha married secondly Hugh IV, Count of Maine.

Notes

References 

990s births
1040 deaths
10th-century Breton people
11th-century dukes of Brittany
Dukes of Brittany
Deaths by poisoning